Kajunguti International Airport is a proposed international airport project in Kagera Region, Tanzania intended to serve the African Great Lakes region.

Background
Initial plans for the airport were first mentioned in the 2010 election manifesto of the Chama Cha Mapinduzi, Tanzania's ruling party as the present Bukoba Airport cannot accommodate larger aircraft.

Project
The airport will be located at Kajunguti Village in Misenyi District. It will occupy an area of at least 15,000 hectares and its design is inspired by Japan's Kansai International Airport. The Tanzania Airports Authority will compensate villagers affected by this project to the tune of TSh 12 billion (US$7 million). As of August 2013, funding has not yet been secured thus delaying the project by 4–5 years.

References

External links
 

Proposed airports in Tanzania
Buildings and structures in the Kagera Region